The 2020 CS Nebelhorn Trophy was held in September 2020 in Oberstdorf, Germany. It was part of the 2020–21 ISU Challenger Series. Medals were awarded in the disciplines of men's singles, ladies' singles, pair skating, and ice dance.

On August 25, 2020, the German Ice Skating Union confirmed that Nebelhorn Trophy would be held as scheduled, but without spectators and would include extensive social distancing guidelines and procedures for the athletes and coaches in attendance. Originally scheduled as the fourth event in the 2020–21 Challenger Series, Nebelhorn Trophy became the first to officially proceed as scheduled, after cancellations and postponements of the preceding events due to the COVID-19 pandemic.

Filipino ladies' singles skater Alisson Krystle Perticheto, whose hometown is in Switzerland, was the only skater on the preliminary entry lists to represent a non-European nation.

Entries 
The International Skating Union published the list of entries on September 1, 2020.

Changes to preliminary assignments

Results

Men

Ladies

Pairs

Ice dance

References 

CS Nebelhorn Trophy
Nebelhorn Trophy